Total project control (TPC) is a project management method that emphasizes continuous tracking and optimization of return on investment (ROI).  It was developed by Stephen Devaux.  It builds upon earlier techniques such as earned value management, critical path method, and program evaluation and review technique, but uses these to track and index projected project profitability as well as the more traditional cost and schedule.  In this way it aims to manage projects as profit and investment centers, rather than cost centers.

Introduced with TPC are a variety of project management metrics and techniques, among them critical path drag, the value breakdown structure (VBS), Devaux's Index of Project Performance (the DIPP), Doubled Resource Estimated Duration (DRED), and Cost of Leveling with Unresolved Bottlenecks (CLUB).

The Project Management Institute's monthly magazine PM Network reviewed the TPC methodology as making "solid points about what can be done to maximize ROI during project execution." In a 2015 PMI white paper on organizational project management, Joseph Sopko wrote about the DIPP:  "The effect of project delivery of any new capability on program NPV should always be quantified and communicated to the project team by the project sponsor... DIPP is the ratio of EMV divided by ETC. As either the EMV is improved or the ETC is reduced, the effect on project value contribution is quantified." He also wrote: "Tools and practices for managing projects and programs as investments have been defined... For example, critical path drag is a concept for evaluating how much any activity along the critical path can be shortened to optimize the project duration."

Later enhancements

Since the total project control approach was introduced in the first edition of Devaux's 1999 book by that title, others have extended both the theory and the practice. In 2013, Tomoichi Sato of JGC Corporation in Yokohama suggested an "extended DIPP" based on risk-based project value. He wrote: "The key concept of Simple DIPP is to obtain the ratio of expected income to cost ETC, neglecting sunk costs in the past. Using  RPV  instead  of  expected  income,  the  author proposes  a criterion  "extended  DIPP".  This represents the ratio of remaining RPV to cost ETC.  If there are project alternatives which are mutually independent, the one with the highest extended DIPP should be chosen... To maximize the project portfolio value of a company, extended DIPP can be used as criteria for prioritisation."

Additionally, critical path drag calculation has been coded into project scheduling software, both in Spider Project and as an add-on product to Microsoft Project from Boyle Project Consulting, PLLC.

Sources

Further reading
 Wideman, R. Max (2004). Total Project Control: A book review
 Gideon Koch (2013) . Value Breakdown Structure VBS
 Kjetil Strand (June 3, 2014), “ACE Introduces the Value Breakdown Structure!” 
 Stephen A. Devaux (June 16, 2014), “The Value Breakdown Structure: Features and Benefits”. 

Project management techniques